Guy L'Écuyer (July 26, 1931 - September 20, 1985) was a Canadian actor from Montreal, Quebec. He was most noted for his performance in André Forcier's 1983 film Au clair de la lune, for which he received a Genie Award nomination for Best Actor at the 5th Genie Awards in 1984.

Following his death in 1985, the Rendez-vous Québec Cinéma launched the Prix Guy-L'Écuyer, which was presented to the year's best acting performance in a Quebec film, in his memory. The award was presented until the organization created the comprehensive Jutra Awards program in 1999.

He was the grandfather of actor Antoine L'Écuyer.

Filmography

Films

Television

References

External links

1931 births
1985 deaths
20th-century Canadian male actors
Canadian male film actors
Canadian male television actors
Canadian male stage actors
French Quebecers
Male actors from Montreal